Fuli railway station is a railway station located in Fuli Township, Hualien County, Taiwan. It is located on the Taitung line and is operated by Taiwan Railways.

References

1926 establishments in Taiwan
Railway stations in Hualien County
Railway stations opened in 1926
Railway stations served by Taiwan Railways Administration